AOL is an internet company founded in 1985 as Quantum Computing Services. Each acquisition is for the respective company in its entirety. The acquisition date listed is the date of the agreement between AOL and the subject of the acquisition. The value of each acquisition is listed in US dollars because AOL is headquartered in the United States. If the value of an acquisition is not listed, then it is undisclosed.

As of August 2013, AOL's largest acquisition has been the purchase of Netscape, a web browser company, for US$4.2 billion.

Netscape's browser was dominant, in terms of market share, but it had lost most of its share to Internet Explorer during the first browser war. By the end of 2007, the usage share of Netscape's browsers had fallen from over 90% in the 1990s, to less than 1%. Its second-largest acquisition is the purchase of MapQuest, a web mapping company. From 1999–2009, MapQuest had the greatest market share among mapping websites; it has since dropped to second place, behind Google Maps. The majority of the companies acquired by AOL are based in the United States. As of April 2008, AOL has acquired 41 companies. Most of the acquired companies are related to the internet, including several internet service providers and web browsers.

In 2001, AOL merged with Time Warner to become AOL Time Warner. Due to the larger market capitalization of AOL, it gained ascendancy in the merger, with its executives largely displacing Time Warner's despite AOL's far smaller assets and revenues. AOL was spun off as its own independent company from Time Warner in 2009.



Acquisitions

References

External links 
  of AOL

AOL
AOL